Aleksandr Marchenko may refer to:
 Aleksandr Marchenko (footballer) (b. 1996), Russian footballer
 Oleksandr Marchenko (b. 1968), Ukrainian rower